Burj Maodah (born 1 March 1983) is a Saudi Arabian footballer plays for Al-Anwar as a midfielder.

References

External links

Burj Ali Maodah at slstat.com

1983 births
Living people
Saudi Arabian footballers
Al-Shabab FC (Riyadh) players
Al-Watani Club players
Al-Hazem F.C. players
Al-Raed FC players
Al-Shoulla FC players
Najd FC players
Al-Riyadh SC players
Tuwaiq Club players
Al-Selmiyah Club players
Al-Anwar Club players
Saudi First Division League players
Saudi Professional League players
Saudi Second Division players
Saudi Fourth Division players
Saudi Third Division players
Association football midfielders